Epidromia pannosa is a moth of the family Noctuidae first described by Achille Guenée in 1852. It is found from southern Florida and central Mexico southward through the Caribbean and Central America to Brazil.

The larvae feed on Psidium species, including Psidium guajava.

References

Moths described in 1852
Calpinae